The 1986 Stella Artois Championships was a men's tennis tournament played on outdoor grass courts at the Queen's Club in London in the United Kingdom that was part of the 1986 Nabisco Grand Prix circuit. It was the 84th edition of the tournament and ran from 9 June until 16 June 1986. Eighth-seeded Tim Mayotte won the singles title.

Finals

Singles

 Tim Mayotte defeated  Jimmy Connors 6–4, 2–1 (Connors retired)
 It was Mayotte's only title of the year and the 3rd of his career.

Doubles

 Kevin Curren /  Guy Forget defeated  Darren Cahill /  Mark Kratzmann 6–2, 7–6
 It was Curren's 2nd title of the year and the 21st of his career. It was Forget's 5th title of the year and the 7th of his career.

References

External links
 Official website
 ATP tournament profile

 
Stella Artois Championships
Queen's Club Championships
Stella Artois Championships
Stella Artois Championships
Stella Artois Championships